The 2016 Monte Carlo Rally (formally known as the 84ème Rallye Automobile Monte-Carlo) was a motor racing event for rally cars that was held over four days between 21 and 24 January 2016. It marked the eighty-fourth running of the Monte Carlo Rally, and was the first round of the 2016 World Rally Championship, WRC-2 and WRC-3 seasons.

Defending World Champion Sébastien Ogier started the season with a win in Monte Carlo, his third consecutive in the principality and the 33rd of his WRC career.

Entry list

Results

Event standings

Special stages

Power Stage
The "Power stage" was a  stage at the end of the rally.

Championship standings after the event

WRC

Drivers' Championship standings

Manufacturers' Championship standings

Other

WRC2 Drivers' Championship standings

WRC3 Drivers' Championship standings

References

External links

 
 The official website of the World Rally Championship

Monte Carlo Rally
Monte Carlo Rally
Rally
Monte Carlo Rally